Sariwangi (stylized as SariWangi) is an Indonesian tea brand currently owned by Unilever. The brand name literally means 'fragrant essence' in Indonesian. Sariwangi was the first Indonesian tea brand to be packaged in bags, as opposed to the more traditional loose serving. This practical way of serving tea caught on with Indonesian consumers, and with Unilever's acquisition of the brand in 1989, Sariwangi remained as the largest tea brand in Indonesia.

History
Johan Alexander Supit from  Tondano, Indonesia, founded PT Sariwangi in 1964. He used his previous experiences working in other tea companies such as Peek, Frean & Co. Ltd and Joseph Tetley & Company to build his own tea exporting company. It is from these companies that Supit gained the technology for packaging tea in bags, which was uncommon then in Indonesia. In 1972, this novel packaging immediately became a success, and for nearly two decades, Sariwangi dominated the Indonesian tea market.

Unilever acquisition
In 1989, Unilever acquired the Sariwangi brand, although Supit remained as its major tea supplier through another company, PT Sariwangi AEA. Since 2015, however, PT Sariwangi AEA encountered financial problems and in late October 2018, it was declared bankrupt by the Central Jakarta Commercial Court. Today, the Sariwangi brand is still produced and sold by PT Unilever Indonesia.

References

External links
 Tentang Sariwangi (In Indonesian)

Indonesian brands
Unilever brands
Tea brands